Kinyarwanda is a 2011 film based on the Rwandan genocide.

Film 
Based on true accounts, the film consists of six interwoven tales several events happening as the genocide takes place. Mosques become a place of refuge, and the taboo of interethnic marriage between a Hutu and a Tutsi is also depicted.

Reception 
Variety described the movie as "doubly disappointing", while the African American Literature Book Club described it as a "brilliant directorial debut".

Awards 

 2011, Sundance Film Festival: World Cinema Audience Award (Dramatic)
 2011, AFI FEST Best International Feature Film (Audience Award)
 2011, AFI FEST Audience Award (World Cinema)

References

External links 
 
 
 

2011 films
Rwandan drama films
Rwandan genocide films